Fabrice Hadjadj (born 1971) is a French writer and philosopher.

Hadjadj was born in Nanterre to Jewish parents of Tunisian heritage. In his teens he was an atheist and anarchist, and he maintained a nihilistic attitude for most of his twenties until, in 1998, he converted to Catholicism. 

His book Réussir sa mort: Anti-méthode pour vivre, won the Grand prix catholique de littérature in 2006. Currently Hadjadj teaches philosophy and literature in Toulon. He is married to the actress Siffreine Michel. They have four daughters and two sons. In 2014, Hadjadj was nominated as member of the Pontifical Council for the Laity.

Publications 
 Traité de Bouddhisme zen à l'usage du bourgeois d'Occident (under the pseudonym Tetsuo-Marcel Kato), Éditions du PARC, 1998
 Et les violents s'en emparent, Éditions Les Provinciales, 1999
 A quoi sert de gagner le monde: Une vie de saint François Xavier, Éditions Les Provinciales, 2002; revised edition 2004 (Play)
 La terre chemin du ciel, Éditions du Cerf, 2002
 La salle capitulaire (with Gérard Breuil), Éditions Les Provinciales, 2003 (Monologues to accompany an exhibition by Breuil)
 Arcabas: Passion Résurrection, Éditions du Cerf, 2004 (Theatrical work to accompany a polyptych by Arcabas)
 Réussir sa mort: Anti-méthode pour vivre, Presses de la Renaissance, 2005 (Grand Prix catholique de littérature)
 Massacre des Innocents: Scènes de ménage et de tragédie, Éditions Les Provinciales, 2006 (Play)
 La profondeur des sexes: Pour une mystique de la chair, Éditions du Seuil, 2008
 L'agneu mystique: Le retable des frères Van Eyck, Éditions de l'Oeuvre, 2008
 Pasiphaé: ou comment l'on devient la mère du Minotaure, Éditions Desclée de Brouer, 2009 (Play)
 La foi des dėmons: ou l'athéisme dépassé, Éditions Salvator, 2009
 Le jugement dernier: Le retable de Beaune, Éditions de l'Oeuvre, 2010
 Le Paradis à la porte: Essai sur une joie qui dérange, Éditions du Seuil, 2011
 Job: ou la torture des amis, Éditions Salvator, 2011
 Comment parler de Dieu aujourd'hui: Anti-manuel d'évangélisation, Éditions Salvator, 2012
 Résurrection, Mode d'emploi, Magnificat, 2015 (French edition)
 The Resurrection: Experience Life in the Risen Christ, Magnificat, 2015 (English edition)
 Dernières nouvelles de l'homme (et de la femme aussi), Éditions Tallandier, 2017,

Notes

External links 

 
  

1971 births
Living people
French people of Tunisian-Jewish descent
Converts to Roman Catholicism from atheism or agnosticism
Converts to Roman Catholicism from Judaism
Members of the Pontifical Council for the Laity
French essayists
French philosophers
French religious writers
French Roman Catholics
French male essayists
People from Nanterre